The following lists events that happened during 2015 in the Grand Duchy of Luxembourg.

Incumbents
Monarch: Henri
Prime Minister: Xavier Bettel

Events
 7 June - The Luxembourg constitutional referendum, 2015 is held.

References

 
2010s in Luxembourg
Years of the 21st century in Luxembourg
Luxembourg
Luxembourg